Nimbostratus virga is a form of Nimbostratus cloud in which the precipitation never reaches the ground. It retains the same features as a normal nimbostratus cloud; dark in appearance, low to medium level cloud of moderate vertical development and  made up of sheets.

See also 

 Virga
 Nimbostratus

Cloud types
Stratus